Koundian is a town in the Guéckédougou Prefecture in the Nzérékoré of south-eastern Guinea.

Populated places in the Nzérékoré Region